Ryan Doghman  (born 14 June 1997) is a Norwegian professional footballer who plays as a left-back for USL Championship side Orange County SC.

Career
Doghman made a single appearance for 2. divisjon side Oppsal in the NM Cup in 2016, before moving to Raufoss, where he played in the 2. divisjon and 1. divisjon and later with Åsane in the 1. divisjon. On 10 January 2023, Doghman signed with USL Championship side Orange County SC ahead of their 2023 season. He debuted for Orange County as a 53rd-minute substitute during a 3–1 loss to Louisville City.

References

External links
Orange County SC bio

1997 births
Åsane Fotball players
Association football defenders
Expatriate soccer players in the United States
Footballers from Oslo
Living people
Norwegian expatriate footballers
Norwegian expatriate sportspeople in the United States
Norwegian footballers
Norwegian Second Division players
Oppsal IF players
Orange County SC players
Raufoss IL players
USL Championship players